Southwest Branch may refer to:

Streams
Southwest Branch Indian River, in Maine
Southwest Branch Rancocas Creek, in New Jersey
Southwest Branch Saint John River, in Maine and Quebec

See also
Little Southwest Branch Saint John River, in Maine